United Office Building, now known as the Giacomo, is a historic Mayan Revival, a subset of art deco, skyscraper in Niagara Falls, New York, US.

History
The United Office Building was designed by architect James A. Johnson of Esenwein & Johnson, one of the most successful architectural firms in Buffalo at the time. It was built by Frank A. Dudley, president of the United Hotels Company of America (later United Hotels of America), and completed in 1929 on the eve of the Great Depression.  The building is one of the most important landmarks in downtown Niagara Falls.  It is constructed of steel and brick with a terra-cotta facade.  The building's Mayan Revival art deco elements of sculpture and pressed terra-cotta brick draw inspiration from the iconography of pre-Columbian Mesoamerican cultures.

The upper five stories of the building include two floors of approximately 3,000 square feet and three top floors of approximately 1,000 square feet each, which were constructed to house mechanical and elevator equipment.

The United Office Building, at 20 stories, was the tallest building in Niagara Falls until 2005, when it was surpassed in height by the nearby Seneca Niagara Casino and Hotel. The top floors have views of the American and Horseshoe Falls of Niagara Falls.

Renovation
The building was abandoned in the 1980s and was vacant for over 25 years.

In 2004, the USA Niagara Development Corporation, a subsidiary to the State's Economic Development Agency, purchased the building for one dollar. Carl Paladino's Ellicott Development Co. undertook extensive renovations of the building, totaling $10 million. In 2010, after the renovation, the building was renamed The Giacomo Hotel and Residences, and now houses 17 apartments, office space, and a 49-room hotel, the Giacomo.

The building was listed on the National Register of Historic Places in 2006.

Gallery

See also
James A. Johnson
Esenwein & Johnson
Frank A. Dudley
National Register of Historic Places listings in Niagara County, New York
Ellicott Development Co.

References

External links

 The Giacomo Hotel & Residences
 
 USA Niagara Development Corporation page on United Office Building
 Niagara Gazette article on building's renovation.

Skyscrapers in New York (state)
Buildings and structures in Niagara Falls, New York
Office buildings on the National Register of Historic Places in New York (state)
Office buildings completed in 1929
Art Deco architecture in New York (state)
United Hotels Company of America
National Register of Historic Places in Niagara County, New York
Skyscraper hotels in New York (state)
Skyscraper office buildings in New York (state)
Residential skyscrapers in New York (state)